The Department of Transport and Regional Services (DOTARS) was an Australian government department that existed between October 1998 and December 2007.

Scope
Information about the department's functions and/or government funding allocation could be found in the Administrative Arrangements Orders, the annual Portfolio Budget Statements, in the Department's annual reports and on the departmental website.

According to the Administrative Arrangements Order (AAO) made on 21 October 1998, the Department dealt with:
Land transport (including road safety)
Civil aviation and air navigation
Aviation security
Delivery of regional and rural specific services
Maritime transport including shipping
Regional development
Matters relating to local government
Planning and land management in the Australian Capital Territory
 Administration of the Jervis Bay Territory, the Territory of Cocos (Keeling) Islands, the Territory of Christmas Island, the Coral Sea Islands Territory, the Territory of Ashmore and Cartier Islands, and of Commonwealth responsibilities on Norfolk Island
 Constitutional development of the Australian Capital Territory
 Constitutional development of the Northern Territory of Australia

Intended outcomes
The department worked to help the Government of the day achieve its policy objectives by contributing to, and reporting against key outcomes. The 2002–03 departmental annual report identified the Department's two key outcomes as:
a better transport system for Australia; and
greater recognition and development opportunities for local, regional and territory communities.

Structure
The Department was an Australian Public Service department responsible to the Minister of the day. The Department was headed by a Secretary. The first Secretary of the Department was Allan Hawke, carrying on his role from the previous Department of Transport and Regional Development. In October 1999, the Prime Minister John Howard announced that Ken Matthews had been appointed as the Department's Secretary, to commence in November of that year. Mike Taylor took over the Secretary role from Matthews in 2004, after indicating to Prime Minister John Howard his strong interest in working in water reform at the National Water Commission.

Ministers and parliamentary secretaries
Ministers and parliamentary secretaries associated with the Department included:
John Anderson, Minister for Transport and Regional Services
Ian Macdonald, Minister for Regional Services, Territories and Local Government
Ron Boswell, Parliamentary Secretary to the Minister for Transport and Regional Services
Warren Truss, Minister for Transport and Regional Services
Jim Lloyd, Minister for Local Government, Territories and Roads
John Cobb, Parliamentary Secretary to the Minister for Transport and Regional Services

Notes

References and further resources

Ministries established in 1998
Transport and Regional Services
2007 disestablishments in Australia
1998 establishments in Australia
Defunct transport organisations based in Australia